Sapies is a 1981 role-playing game supplement published by Group One for Traveller.

Contents
Sapies is an adventure setting on a planet in the Theta Borealis sector, a high-tech world populated by two species at war with each other, the nomadic cygmo and the advanced mitzene.

Publication history
Sapies was published in 1981 by Group One as a 16-page book with a map.

Reception
William A. Barton reviewed Sapies in The Space Gamer No. 48. Barton commented that "Unless you're just completed knocked out by G1's adventure settings and have to have every one published, you can easily find much better than Sapies even among G1's own products."

References

Role-playing game supplements introduced in 1981
Traveller (role-playing game) supplements